Delos Wirick Baxter (July 29, 1857 – September 28, 1918) was an American lawyer and politician.

Baxter was born in Rochelle, Illinois and went to the Rochelle public schools. In 1881, Baxter graduated from the Iowa State University  law school and was admitted to the Illinois bar. Baxter practiced law in Rochelle, Illinois and was also involved in the banking business. He served as mayor of Rochelle and as state's attorney for Ogle County, Illinois. Baxter was a Republican. Baxter served in the Illinois Senate from 1897 to 1901. Baxter died in Rochelle, Illinois.

Notes

External links

1857 births
1918 deaths
People from Rochelle, Illinois
Iowa State University alumni
Businesspeople from Illinois
Illinois lawyers
District attorneys in Illinois
Mayors of places in Illinois
Republican Party Illinois state senators
19th-century American businesspeople
19th-century American lawyers